Heartwork is an EP by Butch Walker, released on July 13, 2004 on Epic Records. It was only available from Sony's online store and featured an enhanced CD portion with the music video to "Mixtape".

Track listing
All songs written by Butch Walker, except where noted.
"Mixtape" – 4:07
"Maybe It's Just Me" – 3:23
"Last Flight Out" – 3:46
"My Best Friend's Magic Girlfriend" (Ric Ocasek) – 3:25
"Mixtape (Acoustic)" – 3:03

Personnel
Kenny Cresswell – drums
Dan Dixon – lapsteel
Jim Ebert – synthesizer, backing vocals, percussion
JT Hall – bass
Joey Huffman – Wurlitzer
Butch Walker – vocals, acoustic guitar, electric guitar, bass, percussion, slide guitar

2004 EPs
Butch Walker albums
Epic Records EPs